The Baptist Union of Croatia (Savez Baptističkih crkava u Republici Hrvatskoj) is a national organization of Baptists in Croatia for promoting fellowship and ministry. The Baptist Union of Croatia is officially recognized by the state.

The first known Baptist activity in this region occurred in the late 19th century. Filip Lotz, converted and baptized in Vienna, returned home in 1883. A ministry arose among the Germans in Daruvar of Slavonia, and later became a Czech and Croatian work. Ivan Zrinscak started Baptist work in Zagreb about 1890, and being converted while in Budapest. The Croatians formed their union in 1991, when Croatia became independent from Yugoslavia.

The Baptist Union is a member of the European Baptist Federation and the Baptist World Alliance. In 2004 there were 41 churches with over 2000 members. Ministries include the Theological Faculty, an educational facility in Zagreb started by Baptists and Lutherans in 1976, and the Baptist Institute, started by the Baptist Union in 1999, and Baptist Aid, "established to coordinate the work of various humanitarian organizations".

External links
Baptist Union of Croatia - official web site (in Croatian)
Information (in English)

References
Baptists Around the World, Albert Wardin, Jr., editor

Protestantism in Croatia
Christian organizations established in 1991
Baptist denominations in Europe
Baptist denominations established in the 20th century
1991 establishments in Croatia